The Astronomer is a painting finished in about 1668 by the Dutch Golden Age painter Johannes Vermeer. It is in oil on canvas with dimensions .

Description

Portrayals of scientists were a favourite topic in 17th-century Dutch painting and Vermeer's oeuvre includes both this astronomer and the slightly later The Geographer. Both are believed to portray the same man, possibly Antonie van Leeuwenhoek. A 2017 study indicated that the canvas for the two works came from the same bolt of material, confirming their close relationship.

The astronomer's profession is shown by the celestial globe (version by Jodocus Hondius) and the book on the table, the 1621 edition of Adriaan Metius's . Symbolically, the volume is open to Book III, a section advising the astronomer to seek "inspiration from God" and the painting on the wall shows the Finding of Moses—Moses may represent knowledge and science ("learned in all the wisdom of the Egyptians").

Provenance

The provenance of The Astronomer can be traced back to 27 April 1713, when it was sold at the Rotterdam sale of an unknown collector (possibly  or his father, of Rotterdam) together with The Geographer. The presumed buyer was Hendrik Sorgh, whose estate sale held in Amsterdam on 28 March 1720 included both The Astronomer and The Geographer, which were described as '' ('An Astrologist by Vermeer of Delft, top-notch') and '' ('Similar by ditto, no less').

Between 1881 and 1888 it was sold by the Paris art dealer Léon Gauchez to the banker and art collector Alphonse James de Rothschild, after whose death it was inherited by his son, Édouard Alphonse James de Rothschild. In 1940 it was seized from his hotel in Paris by the Nazi Einsatzstab Reichsleiter Rosenberg  after the German invasion of France. A small swastika was stamped on the back in black ink. The painting was returned to the Rothschilds after the war, and was acquired by the French state as giving in payment of inheritance taxes in 1983 and then exhibited at the Louvre since 1983.

See also
The Astronomer and his Wife, earlier painting by Gonzales Coques

References

Further reading

External links

Genre paintings by Johannes Vermeer
1668 paintings
Paintings in the Louvre by Dutch, Flemish and German artists
Books in art
Maps in art
Astronomy in the Dutch Republic
Cartography in the Dutch Republic
Early modern Netherlandish cartography
Science and technology in the Dutch Republic